Kristen Jaymes Stewart (born April 9, 1990) is an American actress. The world's highest-paid actress in 2012, she has received various accolades, including a British Academy Film Award and a César Award, in addition to nominations for an Academy Award and a Golden Globe Award.

Born and raised in Los Angeles to parents who both worked in the entertainment industry, Stewart first gained notice at age 12 for her role as the daughter of Jodie Foster's character in David Fincher's thriller Panic Room (2002), which earned her a Young Artist Award nomination. She subsequently starred in Speak (2004), Catch That Kid (2004), Zathura: A Space Adventure (2005), and Into the Wild (2007). She went on to achieve global stardom for her role as Bella Swan in The Twilight Saga film series (2008–2012), which ranks among the highest-grossing film franchises; for the role, she was awarded the BAFTA Rising Star Award in 2010.

After starring in the fantasy film Snow White and the Huntsman (2012), Stewart eschewed roles in big-budget films in favor of independent productions in the years following. She took on roles in the dramas Camp X-Ray (2014) and Still Alice (2014), and the science fiction romance Equals (2016). In 2015, she was acclaimed for her performance in Olivier Assayas' drama film Clouds of Sils Maria, which won her the César Award for Best Supporting Actress. Stewart reunited with Assayas the following year in the supernatural thriller Personal Shopper (2016) and made her directorial debut with the short film Come Swim (2017). She returned to mainstream Hollywood with leading roles in the action film Charlie's Angels (2019) and the romantic comedy film Happiest Season (2020). Stewart's portrayal of Diana, Princess of Wales in Pablo Larraín's biographical drama Spencer (2021) earned her widespread critical acclaim and a nomination for the Academy Award for Best Actress.

Early life
Stewart was born in Los Angeles, California on April 9, 1990. Her father, John Stewart, is a stage manager and television producer, while her Australian mother, Jules Mann-Stewart, is a script supervisor and filmmaker. Jules was adopted by a Jewish couple in California, Norma and Ben Urman, in 1953; a DNA test showed that one of Kristen's biological maternal grandparents was Ashkenazi Jewish. Stewart has an older brother, Cameron B. Stewart, and two adopted brothers, Dana and Taylor. In 2012, her mother filed for divorce after 27 years of marriage.
Stewart grew up in the San Fernando Valley. She attended local schools until the seventh grade, and as she became more involved in acting, she continued her education by distance until graduating from high school. Since she was raised in a family who work in the entertainment industry as non-actors, Stewart thought she would become a screenwriter or a director, but never considered being an actor, saying: "I never wanted to be the center of attention—I wasn't that 'I want to be famous, I want to be an actor' kid. I never sought out acting, but I always practiced my autograph because I love pens. I'd write my name on everything."

Career

Career beginnings and breakthrough (2000s) 

Stewart began acting at age eight, after an agent saw her perform in her elementary school's Christmas play. After auditioning for a year, she got her first role with a small, nonspeaking part in the Disney Channel television film The Thirteenth Year. Her next film was The Flintstones in Viva Rock Vegas, where she played the "ring toss girl". She also appeared in the independent film The Safety of Objects (2001), as the tomboy daughter of a troubled single mother (Patricia Clarkson). Stewart also played the tomboy, diabetic daughter of a divorced mother (Jodie Foster) in the thriller film Panic Room (2002), directed by David Fincher. She was nominated for a Young Artist Award for her performance. Following the success of Panic Room, Stewart was cast in another thriller, Cold Creek Manor (2003), playing the daughter of Dennis Quaid and Sharon Stone's characters and receiving a Young Artist Award nomination for her performance. At this point in her career, she began homeschooling due to her irregular schedule.

At age fourteen, Stewart's first starring role was in the children's action-comedy Catch That Kid (2004), opposite Max Thieriot and Corbin Bleu. That year, Stewart also played the role of Lila in the thriller, Undertow (2004). Stewart starred in the Lifetime/Showtime television film Speak (2004), based on the novel by the same name by Laurie Halse Anderson. Stewart, aged thirteen at the time of filming, played Melinda Sordino, a high school freshman who nearly stops speaking after being raped. Her performance was widely praised, with The New York Times stating "Ms. Stewart creates a convincing character full of pain and turmoil." Stewart appeared in the fantasy-adventure film Zathura: A Space Adventure (2005), playing the role of Lisa Budwing, the irresponsible older sister of two little boys. During their playing a board game, they turn their house into a spacecraft hurtling uncontrollably in outer space. The film was praised by critics, but Stewart's performance did not draw much media attention. Her character is immobilized during most of the film. The following year, she played the character Maya in Fierce People (2006), directed by Griffin Dunne. After that film, she received the lead role of Jess Solomon in the supernatural thriller film The Messengers.

Stewart appeared as teenager Lucy Hardwicke in In the Land of Women (2007), a romantic drama starring Meg Ryan and Adam Brody. The film, as well as Stewart's performance, received mixed reviews. That same year, Stewart had a small role in the Sean Penn-directed adaptation Into the Wild. For her portrayal of Tracy – a teenage singer who has a crush on young adventurer Christopher McCandless (played by Emile Hirsch) – Stewart received mixed reviews. While Salon.com considered her work a "sturdy, sensitive performance", and the Chicago Tribune noted that she did "vividly well with a sketch of a role", Varietys critic Dennis Harvey said, "It's unclear whether Stewart means to be playing hippie-chick Tracy as vapid, or whether it just comes off that way." The film received Screen Actors Guild nomination for Outstanding Performance by a Cast in a Motion Picture. After Into the Wild, Stewart had a cameo appearance in Jumper and also appeared in What Just Happened, which was released in October 2008. She co-starred in The Cake Eaters, an independent film that has been screened only at film festivals. Both the film and Stewart's performance received many positive reviews. Critic Bill Goodykoontz from The Arizona Republic said that Stewart "really shines.... She excels at both aspects of the performance, giving Georgia a strength that defies any sort of pity one might feel for her, without letting us forget her vulnerability".

On November 16, 2007, Summit Entertainment announced that Stewart would play main character Bella Swan in the romantic fantasy film Twilight, based on Stephenie Meyer's novel of the same name. Stewart was on the set of Adventureland when director Catherine Hardwicke visited her for an informal screen test, which "captivated" the director. She starred alongside Robert Pattinson, who plays Edward Cullen, her vampire boyfriend. Stewart described her approach to the role as "capturing ... that first awakening, that ownership of your body and desire". Twilight was released in the U.S. in November 2008. Stewart's performance gained mixed reviews, with Owen Gleiberman of Entertainment Weekly describing her as "the ideal casting choice" and praising her for conveying "Bella's detachment, as well as her need to bust through it", while Claudia Puig of USA Today criticized her acting for being "wooden" and lacking variety in her "blank" facial expressions.

She received praise for her role in Adventureland (2009), a comedy-drama film written and directed by Greg Mottola, and co-starring Jesse Eisenberg. Critic James Berardinelli said, "Stewart is more than merely appealing in this role – she makes Em a fully realized woman, and some of the most intricate development results from what the camera observes in Stewart's eyes." Kenneth Turan of the Los Angeles Times said Stewart was "beautiful, enigmatic and very experienced". and MSN Movies' James Rocchi stated, "Stewart's vulnerable, spooky power is used to nice effect." Stewart reappeared as Bella in a sequel to Twilight, titled New Moon, once again receiving mixed reviews for her performance. Jordan Mintzer from Variety called Stewart "the heart and soul of the film" and praised her for giving "both weight and depth to dialogue...she makes Bella's psychological wounds seem like the real deal." On the other hand, Manohla Dargis from The New York Times said Stewart's "lonely-girl blues soon grow wearisome," and Bill Goodykoontz from The Arizona Republic stated "Stewart is a huge disappointment... She sucks the energy right out of the film". She reprised this role in a third film, Eclipse, which was released in June 2010. Critics were warmer toward the film compared to its predecessors.

Continued Twilight success and dramatic roles (2010s) 
Stewart starred in The Yellow Handkerchief, which debuted at the 2009 Sundance Film Festival and was released in theaters in 2010. She also starred alongside James Gandolfini in Welcome to the Rileys, which premiered at the 2010 Sundance Film Festival. That same year, Stewart portrayed rock star Joan Jett in The Runaways, a biographical film of the titular band from writer-director Floria Sigismondi. Stewart met with Jett to prepare for the role and prerecorded songs in a studio for the film. Praising Stewart's performance, the Metro Times Bill Holdship wrote, "It turns out that Stewart is actually really good at capturing Jett's icy, tough-but-cool girl swagger, adding the needed touches of vulnerability that transform it into a pretty terrific performance... Stewart is a genuine rock star here." Also, A. O. Scott of The New York Times noted a "watchful and unassuming" Stewart "gives the movie its spine and soul." At the 63rd British Academy Film Awards in February 2010, Stewart won the BAFTA Rising Star Award.

Stewart topped Forbes list of "Hollywood's Best Actors for the Buck" in 2011. She was listed as the 13th highest-earning entertainment industry figure in Vanity Fairs "Hollywood's Top 40" list in the same year, with an estimated earning of $28.5 million for her film roles during the year. Forbes also ranked her as the world's highest-paid actress in 2012, with total earnings of $34.5 million. The fourth installment in the Twilight film series, Breaking Dawn – Part 1, was released on November 18, 2011. The Village Voice'''s Dan Konis said Stewart "beautifully underplays" the role, while Emma Dibdin of Total Film described the relationship between Stewart and Pattinson's characters as "like a sad, destructive charade" despite the actors' chemistry.

On December 6, 2011, Stewart was named number one on Forbes magazine's list of "Hollywood's Best Actors for the Buck". On January 13, 2012, she became the face of a new unnamed Balenciaga perfume; in June, its name was promoted as "Florabotanica". Stewart starred as Snow White in the film Snow White and the Huntsman (2012). Stewart appears as Mary Lou in On the Road, the film adaptation of Jack Kerouac's novel of the same name. She concluded the role of Bella Swan in Breaking Dawn – Part 2, released in November 2012. The film attracted a mixed critical response but found success during its box office run, grossing $830 million worldwide and becoming the 81st highest-grossing film. The Twilight film series, dubbed The Twilight Saga, generated $3.32 billion worldwide, making it one of the highest-grossing film franchises. According to Forbes, Stewart was the world's highest-paid actress in 2012, with total earnings of $34.5 million. She earned $12.5 million each for the last two installments in the Twilight series, including royalties.

On December 11, 2013, Chanel announced Stewart as their "new face" for a Western-inspired fashion collection. The campaign was shot by Karl Lagerfeld and released online in May 2014. In 2014, Balenciaga released a new fragrance, Rosabotanica, with Stewart remaining the face of the brand. She was ranked No. 3 on Forbes highest-paid actress in 2013, with a total earning of $22 million, #10 in 2014 with $12 million, and #9 in 2015 with $12 million. Camp X-Ray, her first film of 2014, premiered at the 2014 Sundance Film Festival on January 17. While it generated mixed reviews from critics, Stewart's performance as a young soldier stationed at Guantanamo Bay detention camp received praise. David Rooney of The Hollywood Reporter called it "her best screen work to date [playing the role of] an inexperienced military guard", while Xan Brooks of The Guardian said, "It's a role that reminds us what a fine performer she was in the likes of Into the Wild and Adventureland.". In 2014, she appeared in the music video for Jenny Lewis' "Just One of The Guys", and in The New York Times short movie 9 Kisses.

Stewart next starred alongside Juliette Binoche and Chloë Grace Moretz in Olivier Assayas' Clouds of Sils Maria. The film premiered at the 2014 Cannes Film Festival. Her performance in the film was critically acclaimed. Todd McCarthy of The Hollywood Reporter said that "Stewart's habitual low-keyed style, which can border on the monotone, functions as effectively underplayed contrast." Peter Debruge of Variety praised Stewart's "spontaneous, agitated energy that makes her the most compellingly watchable American actress of her generation." Robbie Collin of The Daily Telegraph described her portrayal as "sharp and subtle, knowable and then suddenly distant" and highlighted the "brilliant lightness of touch" in her approach to the film's twist. For the performance, Stewart won the César Award for Best Supporting Actress, becoming the first American actress to receive a nomination in thirty years. She is the second American winner after Adrien Brody, who won the César Award for Best Actor in 2003. That same year, Stewart appeared alongside Julianne Moore in Still Alice, a drama film that premiered at the 2014 Toronto International Film Festival. Critics commended her performance in the film. Peter Travers of Rolling Stone called her "wonderfully vibrant and contentious" and said: "Even when Still Alice sometimes slips into sentiment, Moore and Stewart are funny, fierce and glorious.

Stewart appeared in Tim Blake Nelson's Anesthesia, an indie drama about a group of New Yorkers, which was released on January 8, 2016, by IFC Films. She co-starred with Jesse Eisenberg again in American Ultra (2015). That same year, she starred in Once and Forever, which was directed by Karl Lagerfeld. Stewart co-starred along with Nicholas Hoult in Drake Doremus' futuristic love story Equals which was released on July 15, 2016. Stewart was confirmed to join Kelly Reichardt's film Certain Women in 2015; the film was released on October 14, 2016. She starred in the Woody Allen film Café Society, opposite Steve Carell and Jesse Eisenberg, marking her third collaboration with the latter. Gaining mixed reviews upon its premiere, the film was released in July 2016. Stewart also reunited with Clouds of Sils Maria director Olivier Assayas to headline his film Personal Shopper, a ghost story that takes place in the fashion industry. She also co-starred in Ang Lee's war drama Billy Lynn's Long Halftime Walk, which was released on November 11, 2016. In December 2016, Stewart appeared in the official music video for the Rolling Stones' single "Ride 'Em on Down". In 2016, Stewart became the youngest actress to be an honoree at the New York Film Festival. In the same year, Stewart was also an honoree at Elles Women in Hollywood Awards alongside Amy Adams, Felicity Jones, Anna Kendrick, Aja Naomi King, Helen Mirren, and Lupita Nyong'o.

In May 2016, it was announced that Stewart would make her directorial debut with a short film for the female-focused digital publisher Refinery29. It would be part of their ShatterBox Anthology. The short film, titled Come Swim, had its world premiere at the 2017 Sundance Film Festival. In June, Stewart appeared in a video ad campaign for Chanel. In 2017, Stewart coauthored a computer science preprint about the use of neural net techniques in the making of her short film Come Swim. That same year, Stewart hosted Saturday Night Live for the first time with musical guest Alessia Cara. and was invited to join the Academy of Motion Picture Arts and Sciences.

In 2018, Stewart appeared opposite Chloë Sevigny in Lizzie, about Lizzie Borden, directed by Craig William Macneill, which had its world premiere at the 2018 Sundance Film Festival. It was released on September 14, 2018, by Saban Films and Roadside Attractions. The film received mixed reviews from critics. She also starred in JT LeRoy, a biopic about Laura Albert, alongside Laura Dern and Diane Kruger. She also appeared in the music video for Interpol's "If You Really Love Nothing". She also served as a member of the jury for the official competition of the 2018 Cannes Film Festival.

 Resurgence (2020s) 

Stewart starred as actress Jean Seberg in Seberg, directed by Benedict Andrews. It premiered at the 76th Venice International Film Festival in August 2019. While the film received mixed reviews, Stewart's performance received praise. Time magazine declared her performance the 10th best performance of 2019. Stewart returned to mainstream Hollywood with starring roles in the action comedy film Charlie's Angels (2019) and the science fiction film Underwater (2020). Critics were mixed in their reviews of both films, but Stewart's performance in the former was well received. Stewart wrote and directed a short film titled Crickets, as part of the anthology series Homemade which follows stories from 18 filmmakers from around the world during the COVID-19 pandemic isolation. It was co-produced by Pablo Larraín's production company, Fabula. The series was released on Netflix on June 30, 2020. Stewart later starred opposite Mackenzie Davis in Happiest Season, an LGBT holiday romance film directed by Clea DuVall, which was released on November 25, 2020.

In June 2020, Stewart was announced as having been cast as Diana, Princess of Wales in Pablo Larraín's biographical drama film Spencer, which chronicles Diana's decision to divorce Charles, Prince of Wales. She worked with a dialect coach and studied Diana's posture for the part. Describing Diana as someone who "sticks out as a sparkly house on fire", Stewart said she "felt more free and alive and able to move" in the role than she did in any of her previous projects. The film premiered at the 78th Venice International Film Festival in September 2021 and released in November that same year. Critics lauded Stewart's portrayal of Diana, with Jonathan Romney of Screen Daily describing it as "brittle, tender, sometimes playful and not a little uncanny" and Kyle Buchanan of The New York Times deeming her casting "a meta stroke of genius". Stewart received nominations for the Academy Award for Best Actress and Golden Globe Award for Best Actress in a Motion Picture – Drama for her performance.

Stewart played an investigator in the film Crimes of the Future. It premiered at the 2022 Cannes Film Festival. In his review, Todd McCarthy of Deadline Hollywood described Stewart's portrayal as "oddly nervous".

In 2023, Stewart was selected as Jury President for the competition section of 73rd Berlin International Film Festival to be held in February.

 Upcoming projects 

Stewart is set to write and direct a film adaptation of writer Lidia Yuknavitch's memoir The Chronology of Water, which would mark her feature film directorial debut. She is attached to play Joan Vollmer, the most prominent female member of the Beat Generation, alongside Ben Foster in his untitled directorial debut, a film adaptation of William S. Burroughs' early works and letters. Stewart is also slated to star in the romantic thriller Love Lies Bleeding from writer-director Rose Glass.

Personal life
Stewart resides in Los Angeles. In 2017, she stated that she is bisexual, saying, "You're not confused if you're bisexual. It's not confusing at all. For me, it's quite the opposite." In 2019, Stewart stated that she had been advised not to be affectionate with her girlfriend in public, in order to land mainstream roles. She said: "I don't want to work with people like that." Stewart identifies as a feminist. She suffers from equinophobia, the fear of horses.

Stewart dated the late Anton Yelchin when they were filming Fierce People; she described him as her "first heartbreak". After their split, Stewart dated her Speak co-star Michael Angarano from 2005 to early 2009. She was in a four-year relationship with her Twilight co-star Robert Pattinson. While dating Pattinson, Stewart was photographed in July 2012 with her Snow White and the Huntsman director, Rupert Sanders, revealing an affair; the day the photos were released, both Stewart and Sanders, who was married at the time, issued public apologies. From mid 2013 to fall 2016, Stewart was in a relationship with visual effects producer Alicia Cargile. From late 2016 to late 2018, she was in a relationship with New Zealand model Stella Maxwell. Stewart has been in a relationship with screenwriter Dylan Meyer since 2019, and stated in November 2021 that she and Meyer were engaged.

In 2012, Stewart signed and donated the dress she wore to the premiere of The Twilight Saga: Breaking Dawn – Part 2 to a CharityBuzz auction benefiting the Robin Hood Foundation's Sandy Relief Fund, which provides long-term support to those affected by Hurricane Sandy. In 2016, she participated in building a school in Nicaragua through the nonprofit buildOn, with the goal being to give children the opportunity to become educated in a safe space and to break the cycle of poverty and illiteracy. The following year, she raised $500,000 for Hurricane Sandy relief by meeting with an unnamed "Middle Eastern prince" for 15 minutes.

Stewart ranked number 7 on AskMen's list of "Top 99 Women" for 2013. Glamour UK named her the best-dressed woman in 2012, 2013, and 2016. In 2020, Stewart received the Actress of the Decade Award by the Hollywood Critics Association.

Filmography
Film

Television

Music videos

As director

Awards and nominations

Stewart has received a César Award, a Milano Film Festival Award, a Young Artist Award, and the BAFTA Rising Star Award. She won the National Society of Film Critics, New York Film Critics Circle, and Boston Society of Film Critics Award for Best Supporting Actress for her performance in Clouds of Sils Maria. She has also been nominated for the Academy Award, Golden Globe Award and Critics' Choice Award for Best Actress, for her performance in Spencer''.

References

External links

 
Kristen Stewart Breaks Down Her Career, Vanity Fair, published by YouTube July 30, 2019

1990 births
20th-century American actresses
21st-century American actresses
Actresses from Los Angeles
American child actresses
American film actresses
American television actresses
BAFTA Rising Star Award winners
Best Supporting Actress César Award winners
Bisexual actresses
Living people
LGBT people from California
American feminists
American bisexual actors
Jewish American actors